Little Thorpe is a hamlet in County Durham, England. It is situated between Easington and Peterlee.

This small settlement literally derives its name from the fact it is a small village, as "Thorpe" is Anglo-Saxon for village.

It seems to have been a community that was originally centred on a farmstead, and most of the buildings appear to be in the Elizabethan style, but are more probably Victorian in age.

References

Villages in County Durham